The 1960–61 Yugoslav Ice Hockey League season was the 19th season of the Yugoslav Ice Hockey League, the top level of ice hockey in Yugoslavia. Six teams participated in the league, and Jesenice have won the championship.

Final ranking

Jesenice
Partizan
Red Star
Ljubljana
Beograd
Zagreb

References

External links
Yugoslav Ice Hockey League seasons

Yugo
Yugoslav Ice Hockey League seasons
1960–61 in Yugoslav ice hockey